The South African Human Rights Commission (SAHRC) was inaugurated in October 1995 as an independent chapter nine institution. It draws its mandate from the South African Constitution by way of the Human Rights Commission Act of 1994.

Commissioners
A seven-year term is given to appointees.

2009/2010 
Seven commissioners were appointed for a seven-year term in 2009/2010, namely Adv Lawrence Mushwana, Dr Pregaluxmi Govender, Ms Lindiwe Mokate, Adv Bokankatla Malatji, Adv Loyiso Mpumlwana, Ms Janet Love (part-time) and Dr Danfred Titus (part-time). Mushwana, who was previously the Public Protector, was elected Chairperson and Govender was elected Deputy Chairperson in October 2009. In July 2010, the National Assembly's justice committee decided unanimously that Mpumlwana's failure to disclose a civil judgement against him during the nomination process meant that he was not fit and proper to serve on the SAHRC.

In February 2014, Advocate Mohamed Shafie Ameermia was appointed commissioner focusing on housing and access to justice.

2017 
For the seven-year term in 2017, Bongani Christopher Majola was appointed Chairperson of the South African Human Rights Commission, with Fatima Chohan the Deputy Chairperson. The full-time commissioners were Adv Bokankatla Joseph Malatji, Philile Ntuli, Adv Andre Hurtley Gaum, Matlhodi Angelina (Angie) Makwetla. The part-time commissioners were Adv Jonas Ben Sibanyoni and Christoffel Nissen.

Criticism 
The trade union Solidarity has criticised the commission for what it claims is racial bias and prejudice. A comparative study revealed that the SAHRC is much more likely to self-initiate investigation where the perpetrator is white, and that it is more lenient in its punishment of black perpetrators.

Accusations of racial double standards 
Complaints were laid at the SAHRC against controversial politician Julius Malema regarding several statements he had made. Malema had said "kill the Boer" (Boer meaning white South African/Afrikaner), that he "was not calling for the slaughter of whites, yet" and had made racist remarks against Indian South Africans, accusing them of exploiting black people. In March 2019 the SAHRC stated that Malema's comments were not found to be hate-speech, claiming to have found no basis in law for Malema's comments to be ruled as hate speech. This was despite Malema being found guilty in 2011 by the Johannesburg High Court of hate speech for chanting "Shoot the Boer".

SAHRC commissioners admit that the Commission is biased in favour of black people. Dr. Shanelle Van Der Berg of the SAHRC justified the SAHRC's ruling on Malema by stating that the council applies different thresholds of what constitutes hate speech depending on the race of the alleged perpetrator, due to the nation's history. Priscilla Jana, a commissioner responsible for race and equity issues, has stated that the SAHRC is "purposefully lenient to black offenders in incidents concerning racial utterances made to white victims because of the historical context".

References

External links
 Official site of the South African Human Rights Commission

Human rights organisations based in South Africa
Government of South Africa
National human rights institutions
1994 establishments in South Africa
Chapter nine institutions